John E. Cheatham House is a historic home located at Lexington, Lafayette County, Missouri.  It was built about 1868, and is a two-story, Italianate style brick dwelling. It has a low-pitched, metal-covered hipped roof with a bracketed cornice. A one-story kitchen addition was constructed about 1880. Also on the property is the contributing brick root cellar.

It was listed on the National Register of Historic Places in 1993.

References

Houses on the National Register of Historic Places in Missouri
Italianate architecture in Missouri
Houses completed in 1868
Houses in Lafayette County, Missouri
National Register of Historic Places in Lafayette County, Missouri